Liu Chang (born 15 April 1993) is a Chinese actor and singer. He is best known for his roles in the film Tomb of the Sea Side Story: Hua Mei and series Reunion: The Sound of the Providence.

Early life 
Liu Chang born on 15 April 1993 in Tianshui, Gansu Province. In 2004, he appeared in the CCTV children's education drama The Story of Science and Technology Museum, playing as Ou Yangyang.

Liu Chang graduated with a degree in music from the Communication University of China. During his university life, he has participated in the 28th "Guangyuan Spring" Campus Singer Competition held by the school and won the champion "Little Baiyang" award along with both "Most Popular Male Singer" and "Best Internet Popularity" award.

Career
Liu officially debuted as an actor in 2018 with the action series Tomb of the Sea, playing Wang Can. He then starred in action film Tomb of the Sea Side Story: Hua Mei where he played the leading role for the first time. Thereafter, he became known to the audience.

In 2020, he played a supporting role in the drama Symphony's Romance. In the same year, he started to gain increased attention and popularity with his role as Liu Sang in the popular action mystery series Reunion: The Sound of the Providence, based on Xu Lei's tomb-raiding novel. Also in 2020, he starred in the season 2 of The Lost Tomb: Reboot.

Filmography

Television

Film

Sound track

References

External links 
 Liu Chang on Sina Weibo

Living people
1993 births
Chinese male television actors
21st-century Chinese male actors
Chinese male film actors